The 2017 Japanese Regional Leagues were a competition between parallel association football leagues ranking at the bottom of the Japan Football League.

Champions list
Qualified for the Japan Regional Football Champions League 2017

Along them, also Matsue City FC and FC TIAMO Hirakata qualified for the final tournament as they featured in the Top 4 of 2017 All Japan Senior Football Championship. To complete the scenario, also FC Kariya were picked to participate.

Hokkaido

Tohoku

Division 1

Division 2 North

Division 2 South

Kantō

Division 1

Division 2

Hokushinetsu

Division 1

Division 2

Tokai

Division 1

Division 2

Kansai

Division 1

Division 2

Chūgoku

Shikoku

Kyushu

See also 
 Japanese Regional Leagues

References

2017
Regional Leagues